Mollie Steimer (1897–1980) was a Ukrainian Jewish anarchist activist. After settling in New York City, she quickly became involved in the local anarchist movement and was caught up in the case of Abrams v. United States. Charged with sedition, she was eventually deported to Soviet Russia, where she met her lifelong partner Senya Fleshin and agitated for the rights of anarchist political prisoners in the country. For her activities, she and Fleshin were again deported to western Europe, where they spent time organising aid for exiles and political prisoners, and took part in the debates of the international anarchist movement. Following the rise of the Nazis in Europe, she and Fleshin fled to Mexico, where they spent the rest of their lives working as photographers.

Biography
On November 21, 1897, Mollie Steimer was born in Dunaivtsi, a village in the south-west of the Russian Empire (modern-day Ukraine). At the age of 15, she and her family emigrated to the United States, settling in a ghetto of New York City and setting to work at a garment factory. At this time, she started to read radical political literature, such as Women and Socialism by August Bebel and Underground Russia by Sergey Stepnyak-Kravchinsky.

Early activism
By the outbreak of the Russian Revolution, Steimer had gravitated towards anarchism, inspired by the works of Mikhail Bakunin, Peter Kropotkin and Emma Goldman. Together with other Jewish anarchists, Steimer helped form a clandestine collective called Der Shturm ("The Storm"), which published radical works in the Yiddish language. Following some internal conflict, in January 1918, the group reorganized and launched a new monthly journal titled Frayhayt ("Freedom"), which published articles by Jewish radicals such as Georg Brandes and Maria Goldsmith. The journal's motto was a Henry David Thoreau quote: "That government is best which governs not at all".

Several of the collective's members, including Steimer, lived and worked together in a six-room apartment on Harlem's East 104th Street. Due to the political repression brought by the Espionage Act of 1917 and the tense political climate that preceded the First Red Scare, the collective was forced to distribute Frayhayt in secret, as it had been among the papers banned by the federal government for its anti-war and far-left political stances. By the summer of 1918, the group had drawn the attention of the authorities, after they had begun distributing leaflets denouncing the allied intervention in the Russian Civil War and calling for a social revolution in the United States by means of a general strike.

Arrest, trial and imprisonment
Steimer herself distributed thousands of copies around New York, including at her own workplace. On August 23, she threw a handful of the leaflets out of a window, which alerted the police, who arrested Steimer after receiving information from an informant within the Frayhayt group. Their apartment was subsequently raided and a number of their other members were arrested, on charges of conspiracy, under the Sedition Act of 1918. During their trial, which came to be known as the case of Abrams v. United States, Steimer gave a speech in which she declared: 

On October 25, 1918, Steimer and her co-defendants were found guilty, with Steimer herself being sentenced to 15 years in prison and a $500 fine. With support from a wide range of society, notably including Zechariah Chafee and the entire staff of Harvard Law School, the sentence was appealed and the defendants were released on bail. Steimer returned to activism, for which she was arrested multiple times over the following year. On March 11, 1919, during a police raid against the Russian People's House on New York's East 15th Street, Steimer was arrested on charges of incitement and subsequently transferred to Ellis Island. Following a hunger strike against the conditions of her solitary confinement, Steimer was released before she could be deported, although the government kept her under surveillance. Back in New York, she met Emma Goldman, with whom she developed a lifelong friendship.

On October 30, 1919, Steimer was arrested again and imprisoned on Blackwell's Island. For six months, she was again held in solitary confinement, which she likewise protested with another hunger strike and by loudly singing revolutionary songs. When the Supreme Court upheld her conviction, her co-defendants informed her of a plan to flee the country into exile, but Steimer herself refused to cooperate, as she didn't want to dishonor the workers that had paid her $40,000 in bail. In April 1920, Steimer was transferred to Jefferson City, Missouri, where she was held for a year and a half. By this time, she had learnt of the death of her brother from influenza and her father from shock. Her lawyer managed to secure her release, on the condition of her deportation. But she initially refused to accept this, due to her staunch opposition to state borders and her concern for fellow political prisoners of the United States. Nevertheless, after some convincing, she arrived back at Ellis Island, where she eagerly awaited her chance to participate in the Russian Revolution.

Deportation and exile
On November 24, 1921, Steimer and her co-defendants were deported to the Russian Soviet Republic on the Estonia. By the time they arrived in Moscow, on December 15, 1921, there were no anarchists left to greet them. Emma Goldman had left for exile, Peter Kropotkin had died of old age and any left-wing uprisings against the Bolsheviks had been suppressed by the Red Army, while hundreds more anarchists were still held in the prisons of the Cheka. Despite the climate of political repression, Steimer made a new home in Petrograd, where she met and fell in love with Senya Fleshin, a veteran of the Makhnovist movement. Together they established an organization to aid political prisoners in Russia, for which they were arrested on November 1, 1922 and sentenced to exile in Siberia. But after they carried out a hunger strike, they were released on November 18, on the condition that they remain in Petrograd and report regularly to the authorities. Despite these conditions, they continued their activities, and were again arrested on July 9, 1923. Following another hunger strike and protests made to Leon Trotsky by anarcho-syndicalist delegates of the Profintern, they were again released, although this time they were to be deported.

On September 27, 1923, Steimer and Fleshin were deported to Germany, where they were reunited with Emma Goldman and Alexander Berkman in Berlin. From the German capital, Steimer wrote articles about her experiences in Russia for the British anarchist newspaper Freedom, to which she denounced the authoritarianism of the Communist Party. The couple also continued their activities in aiding Soviet political prisoners, now as members of the International Workers' Association. In 1924, they joined their fellow exile Volin to Paris, where they established a mutual aid society for anarchist exiles from all countries and participated in the debate around the Platform, which Steimer criticised as authoritarian. During this period, Steimer also met a number of other anarchsts, including Harry Kelly, Rose Pesotta, Rudolf Rocker and Milly Witkop, and was briefly reunited with her co-defendants Jack and Mary Abrams, who had also left Russia out of disillusionment with the Revolution.

In 1929, the couple briefly returned to Berlin, where Fleshin worked as a photographer, but following the ascent to power of Adolf Hitler's Nazi Party, they returned to Paris in order to escape rising antisemitism. In the wake of the invasion of France by Nazi Germany, on May 18, 1940, Steimer was sent to a concentration camp, on account of her Jewish heritage and her anarchist political beliefs. She remained at Camp Gurs for seven weeks, before escaping with the aid of May Picqueray and other friends during the chaotic transfer of power to the collaborationist French State. Once she was reunited with Fleshin in Marseilles, the couple escaped across the Atlantic to Mexico.

Later life
In Mexico City, the couple operated a photographic studio, became close with a group of Spanish anarchist exiles and were once again reunited with Jack and Mary Abrams. In 1963, Steimer and Fleshin retired to Cuernavaca, where they kept up with the development of the international anarchist movement and received visitors from the United States. In the late 1970s, Steimer was interviewed by a number of film crews about Emma Goldman and her anarchist convictions, to which she remained a stalwart into her old age.

Mollie Steimer died of heart failure in her Cuernavaca home on July 23, 1980, aged 82. Senya Fleshin died less than a year later.

See also
 Anarchist Black Cross
 Polar Bear Expedition

References

Bibliography

Further reading

External links 

1897 births
1980 deaths
American anarchists
American anti-war activists
American anti–World War I activists
American people of Ukrainian-Jewish descent
Anarcho-communists
Emigrants from the Russian Empire to the United States
Free speech activists
Gurs internment camp survivors
Jewish anarchists
Jewish emigrants from Nazi Germany to France
Jewish refugees
Mexican anarchists
Mexican people of Ukrainian-Jewish descent
Non-interventionism
People convicted of sedition
People convicted under the Espionage Act of 1917
People deported from Russia
People deported from the United States
People from Dunaivtsi
Soviet anarchists
Soviet expellees
Soviet Jews
Soviet emigrants to France
Soviet emigrants to Germany
Soviet emigrants to Mexico
Ukrainian anarchists
Ukrainian Jews
Yiddish-language writers